The Scottish Rite Masonic Center in San Francisco, California is the meeting hall of a local Valley (chapter) of the Scottish Rite, as well as several local Masonic lodges.

External links
San Francisco Scottish Rite

Masonic buildings in California
Buildings and structures in San Francisco